Glomerella is a beetle genus in the tribe Sticholotidini.

See also 
 List of Coccinellidae genera

References

External links 
 
 

Coccinellidae genera